The Games Machine, also known by the acronym TGM, is an Italian video game magazine that features previews, reviews and cheat codes.

History 
Launched in September 1988 as the Italian edition of the British magazine The Games Machine by the Milan-based publishing company Xenia Edizioni. The publishing of the Italian edition has continued also after the close of the British edition, The Games Machine became one of the most popular video games magazine in Italy. In November 2005, the former owner sold the magazine to Future Media Italy, a division of Future Publishing, and in January 2007 was acquired by the Italian publishing company Sprea Media Italy. In 2014, property of the magazine was transferred again, this time to Aktia SRL.

TGM is the only remaining Italian PC gaming magazine, having survived all its historical rivals (Zeta was shut down in March 2001, K in December 2003, Giochi per il Mio Computer in August 2012). In August 2013, The Games Machine celebrated its 300th issue and its 25th anniversary, becoming the second longest-running videogame magazine in the world behind the Japanese Famitsu, and the longest-running PC gaming magazine ever. The event also saw the relaunch of the magazine's website.

See also
 List of magazines in Italy

External links 
  

1988 establishments in Italy
Video game magazines published in Italy
Italian-language magazines
Home computer magazines
Monthly magazines published in Italy
Magazines established in 1988
Magazines published in Milan